In computing, SNA (Sandybridge's New Acceleration) is a graphics acceleration architecture for the X.Org Server developed by Intel as a replacement for UXA.

See also
 EXA
 UXA
 Direct Rendering Infrastructure
 Glamor

References

X-based libraries